William G. Petty (born 1949) is a Judge of the Virginia Court of Appeals.

Life and education

Petty was born in 1949 in Santa Monica, California. He received his Bachelor of Arts from College of William & Mary and his Juris Doctor from William & Mary Law School.

Legal career

Prior to his selection to the court Petty served as Lynchburg Commonwealth's Attorney for over two decades.

Service on Virginia Court of Appeals

He was first elected by the General Assembly on March 10, 2006, to an eight-year term beginning March 16, 2006. He was then subsequently elected to a second eight-year term in 2014. His current term expires in on March 3, 2022.

References

External links

Living people
1949 births
20th-century American lawyers
21st-century American judges
College of William & Mary alumni
Judges of the Court of Appeals of Virginia
People from Santa Monica, California
Virginia lawyers
William & Mary Law School alumni